Iftikhar Ahmad Cheema ; is a Pakistani politician who had been a member of the National Assembly of Pakistan, from June 2008 to May 2018. He is a retired Justice.

Early life
He is the son of middle class farmer & he completed his LLB from punjab university and started practicing in Wazirabad bar council.

Political career
He was elected to the National Assembly of Pakistan as a candidate of Pakistan Muslim League (N) (PML-N) from Constituency NA-101 (Gujranwala-VII) in 2008 Pakistani general election. He received 71,792 votes and defeated Hamid Nasir Chattha.

He was re-elected to the National Assembly as a candidate of PML-N from Constituency NA-101 (Gujranwala-VII) in 2013 Pakistani general election. He received 99,924 votes and defeated Muhammad Ahmad Chatha, a candidate of Pakistan Muslim League (J).

References

Living people
Pakistan Muslim League (N) politicians
Pakistani judges
Pakistani MNAs 2008–2013
Pakistani MNAs 2013–2018
1939 births